Copa annulata is a species of spider in the family Corinnidae. It is endemic to Sri Lanka.

References

Corinnidae
Endemic fauna of Sri Lanka
Spiders of Asia
Spiders described in 1896